Academy Fantasia, Season 9 is the ninth season of Academy Fantasia which premiered on True Visions in June 2012.

Changes from Season 8
Similar to the 8th season, season 9 consisted three channels for audition, Live, Online and Academic institutions audition. However, in this season the audition participants from the Academic Institutions audition who pass the audition would not be automatically became the finalists, instead they had to competed again with the contestants from the Live and Online audition for the spot as a finalist.

Season 9 finished the audition with 24 contestants got a chance to get into the house similar to season 8, but in this season, the 24 contestants would not yet received their V number for the competition. Instead, they had to compete in the "Minor House" in the first three weeks of the season for the spot as the final 12 in the "Main House", and the eight judges would selected six contestants from the twenty-four to joined their "team", two judges per team, with two teams of men and two teams of women. By each weeks, each team's judges would selected one contestants who performed the weakest and eliminated them out of the competition, which made two male and two female contestants be eliminated in each concert, similar to season 8, until each team had three remaining contestants, the remaining contestant will become the 12 main finalists of season 9 and received their V number.

However, in the third concert, after each team's judges selected their first two contestants to be the season 9's finalists, leaving four spots in the final 12, the remaining eight contestants who not yet be selected were joined by eight eliminated contestants from the first two concerts, and all eight judges had to decide to pick four out of sixteen them to be the 12 finalists. The full list of the 12 main finalists of season 9 was revealed on the first day of the Main House competition, at the beginning of the fourth week of the season, which consisting of five female contestants and seven male contestants.

Auditions
There were three channel for auditions, Live, Online and Academic institutions audition. The contestants were required to between the ages of 15 to 25 years old who are not embedded with music recording contracts.

The Live Auditions were held in the following cities:
 The South district, Surat Thani
 The Northeast district, Nakhon Ratchasima
 The North district, Chiangmai
 The Center district, Bangkok

Semi-finalists

The 24 contestants

Team 1 - ครูปุ้ม + ปู
 Nest
 Ice
 Opol
 Mind (Elim)
 None (Elim)
 Pla (Elim)
Team 2 - ครูรัก + แมว
 Kat 
 Baimonh
 Nook (Elim)
 Pam (Elim)
 Baitong (Elim)
 Dew (Elim)

Team 3 - ครูเป็ด + ครูก๊องสุ์
 Bright
 Zo
 K
 Fluke (Elim)
 Earth (Elim)
 Sony (Elim)
Team 4 - ป้าแจ๋ว + ทาทา
 Earth
 Kong
 Bombay
 Sunny
 Tawich (Elim)
 Tung (Elim)

Concert summaries

Top 24 - My Choose Song #1 (Semi-final Week 1)

Team 1

Team 3

Team 2

Team 4

Top 20 - My Choose Song #2 (Semi-final Week 2)

Team 1

Team 3

Team 2

Team 4

Top 16 - My Choose Song #3 (Semi-final Week 3)

Team 1

Team 3

Team 2

Team 4

Group Performances
 Team 1 - "ส่งต่อจากความรัก" (Boyd Kosiyabong Feat. รวมศิลปิน เบเกอรี่มิวสิค)
 Team 2 - "ลมหายใจ" (Boyd Kosiyabong/Mr. Z Feat. ป๊อด ธนชัย)
 Team 3 - "ไม่มีเธอวันนั้น ไม่มีฉันวันนี้" (D2B)
 Team 4 - "ช่วงที่ดีที่สุด" (Boyd Kosiyabong/ป๊อด ธนชัย Feat. วินัย พันธุรักษ์)

Top 12 - 12 Dreams 12 Styles (Week 1)

Top 11 - Re-stage: Friend's song (Week 2)

Top 10 - Thai's life (Week 3)

Top 9 - First Love (Week 4)

Group performances
 Various Artists - "รักครั้งแรก" (ชาตรี)

Top 9 - Killer Song (Week 5)

Top 8 - The Battle: Senior's Song (Week 6)

Top 8 - Mother's song (Week 7)

Top 7 - Dance City (Week 8)

Group performances
 Males - "ละลาย" (โฟร์-มด)
 Females - "ซ่าส์...สั่น ๆ" (D2B)

Top 6 - Duets (Week 9)

Top 5 - Musical (Week 10)

Group performances
 Various Artists - "คนข้างๆ" (25 hours)

Top 5 - Settha Sirachaya (Week 11)

Group performances
 Males - หนาวเนื้อ
 Females -  ทะเลไม่เคยหลับ
 Various Artists - จูบฟ้าลาดิน & โอ้รัก

Final - True AF9 The final (Week 12)

Finalists

In order of elimination
(ages stated are at time of competition)

Summaries

Elimination chart

Professional trainers
Principal
 ยุทธนา ลอพันธุ์ไพบูลย์
 ศรัทธา ศรัทธาทิพย์ 
Voice Trainers
 อรวรรณ เย็นพูนสุข
 ศุษณะ ทัศน์นิยม
 นันทนา บุญหลง
 วรางคณิภา พวงธนะสาร
Dance Trainers

Acting Trainers

Judges
 Tata Young
 Jirasak Panpun
 Suthee Saengserichol
 Prakasit Bosuwan

References

Academy Fantasia